The Escola Superior de Estudos Industriais e de Gestão (Superior School of Industrial Studies and Management) or ESEIG is a higher learning polytechnic school in the conurbation of Póvoa de Varzim and Vila do Conde, Portugal.

ESEIG was founded in 1990, as part of Porto Polytechnic (IPP), and was based in two campuses (one in each city), but it was united in a single new school, on the border between the two cities. Virtually all the campus is located in Póvoa de Varzim, although the school often uses a Vila do Conde address.

The school offers degrees in:
 Web Technologies and Information Systems 
 Science and Technology of Documentation and Information
 Accounting and Administration
 Design
 Biomedical Engineering
 Industrial Engineering and Management
 Mechanical Engineering
 Hotel Management and Administration
 Human Resources

External links
ESEIG 
Politécnico do Porto

Polytechnic Institute of Porto
Education in Póvoa de Varzim
Buildings and structures in Póvoa de Varzim